KWRX (88.5 FM) is a non-commercial classical music radio station in Redmond, Oregon, broadcasting to the Bend, Oregon area.  KWRX is a simulcast of KWAX in Eugene, Oregon.

Repeaters and Translators
KWRX is simulcast on the following stations and translators:

91.1 FM in Eugene, Oregon (KWAX)
91.5 FM in Florence, Oregon (KWVZ)
90.9 FM in Sunriver, Oregon
91.3 FM in Newport, Oregon
92.9 FM in Corvallis, Oregon
92.9 FM in Salem, Oregon
97.9 FM in Roseburg, Oregon
98.9 FM in Bend, Oregon
101.9 FM in Cottage Grove, Oregon
105.3 FM in Glide, Oregon

External links
KWAX official website

WRX
Classical music radio stations in the United States
Redmond, Oregon
Radio stations established in 1972
1972 establishments in Oregon